This article lists the winners and nominees for the Black Reel Award for Outstanding Costume Design. The award is given to the costume designer of the nominated film. The category was first introduced at the 19th Annual Black Reel Awards where Ruth E. Carter took home the first award in this category for Black Panther. Carter took home the award again in 2020 for Dolemite Is My Name becoming the second person following Denzel Washington to have consecutive wins in the same category.

Winners and nominees

2010s

2020s

Multiple nominations and wins

Multiple Wins

 2 wins
 Ruth E. Carter

Multiple nominations

 3 nominations 
 Ruth E. Carter

 2 nominations 
 Marci Rodgers
 Paul Tazewell

References

Black Reel Awards